The secretary of state of Arizona is an elected position in the U.S. state of Arizona. Since Arizona does not have a lieutenant governor, the secretary stands first in the line of succession to the governorship. The secretary also serves as acting governor whenever the governor is incapacitated or out of state. The secretary is the keeper of the Seal of Arizona and administers oaths of office. The current office holder is Democrat Adrian Fontes.

Duties
The secretary is in charge of a wide variety of other duties as well. The secretary is in charge of four divisions:
 The secretary is in charge of the Arizona Advance Directive Registry, which is the official state repository of advance directives such as living wills, Medical Powers of Attorney, and Mental Health Powers of Attorney.
 The Business Services Division is responsible for registering trademarks, trade names, and liens under the Uniform Commercial Code.  This division also issues apostilles, files intergovernmental agreements and notices of public meetings, and regulates notaries public, employment agencies, sports agents, out-of-state landlords, telemarketers, and charitable organizations.  The Business Services Division is responsible for chartering partnerships; corporations, on the other hand, are the responsibility of the Arizona Corporation Commission.
 The Elections Division is responsible for administering all elections in the state, and certifying their results.  This division also regulates lobbying and campaign finance.
 The Public Services Division is responsible for filing bills from the Arizona Legislature, registering and publishing administrative regulations, and publishes the Arizona Blue Book, which is an informational guide to the government of Arizona.

The secretary administers the Arizona State Library, Archives and Public Records.

History
The longest-served secretary is Wesley Bolin, who served 12 full terms (including the last two-year term and the first four-year term), and 1 partial term for a total of 28 years, 9 months, 18 days (or 10,518 days). Bolin was also the shortest-serving governor, ascending to the governorship in 1977 after Raúl Héctor Castro resigned, and serving only 5 months before his death.

The second-longest-serving is James H. Kerby who was elected to 6 two-year terms in 1923–1929, and again in 1933–1939. He is also the only one to serve non-consecutively in the office. The shortest tenure goes to John C. Callaghan who died 20 days after his inauguration.

Only two Secretaries of State have been elected governor without having first ascended to the office upon the death, resignation, or impeachment of a sitting governor: Sidney P. Osborn and Katie Hobbs. Osborn was also the first governor to die in office, making Dan Garvey the first Secretary of State to ascend to the position. Since then, four other Secretaries of State have become governor through filling a vacancy.

Officeholders
 Parties

See also
 List of company registers

Notes

References

External links